The following outline is provided as an overview of and topical guide to obstetrics:

Obstetrics – medical specialty dealing with the care of all women's reproductive tracts and their children during pregnancy (prenatal period), childbirth and the postnatal period.

What is obstetrics? 

Obstetrics can be described as all of the following:
 Medicine – medicine is the science and art of healing. It encompasses a variety of health care practices evolved to maintain and restore health by the prevention and treatment of illness in human beings.
 Medical specialty – branch of medical science. After completing medical school, physicians or surgeons usually further their medical education in a specific specialty of medicine by completing a multiple year residency to become a medical specialist.
 Academic discipline – In addition to being a medical specialty, obstetrics is the study of the reproductive process within the female body, including fertilization, pregnancy and childbirth.

History of obstetrics 

 Childbirth and obstetrics in antiquity

Medical history 

 Gravidity and parity

Pregnancy and childbirth 
 Pregnancy
 Childbirth

Family planning 
 Family planning
 Birth control
 Contraception
 Pre-conception counseling

Female reproductive anatomy 
 Amniotic fluid
 Amniotic sac
 Amnion
 Cervix
 Endometrium
 Fallopian tube
 Ovaries
 Pelvis
 Pelvic bone width
 Placenta
 Uterus – Also called a womb.
 Vagina

Conception 

 Human fertilization
 Assisted reproductive technology
 Artificial insemination
 Fertility medication
 In vitro fertilisation
 Fertility awareness
 Unintended pregnancy

Testing 
 Pregnancy test
 3D ultrasound
 Home testing
 Obstetric ultrasonography
 Prenatal testing

Prenatal stage

Prenatal development 

 Prenatal development
 Fundal height
 Gestational age
 Human embryogenesis
 Maternal physiological changes

Prenatal care 
 Prenatal care – regular medical and nursing care recommended for women during pregnancy.  Also known as antenatal care.
 Prenatal nutrition
 Maternal nutrition
 Nutrition and pregnancy
 Concomitant conditions
 Diabetes mellitus and pregnancy
 Systemic lupus erythematosus and pregnancy

Prenatal monitoring 

 Amniocentesis
 Chorionic villus sampling
 Cardiotocography
 Nonstress test

Childbirth 
 Childbirth

Preparation for childbirth 

 Adaptation to extrauterine life
 Bradley method of natural childbirth
 Hypnobirthing
 Lamaze technique
 Nesting instinct

Roles during childbirth 
 Doula
 Midwife
 Mother – a woman who has raised a child, given birth to a child, and/or supplied the ovum that united with a sperm which grew into a child. During childbirth, she is the patient.
 Perinatal nursing
 Men's role in childbirth
 Obstetrician

Delivery 
 Pelvimetry
 Bishop score
 Cervical dilation
 Cervical effacement
 Position
 Home birth
 Multiple birth
 Natural childbirth
 Unassisted childbirth
 Water birth
 Aspects and conditions
 Bloody show
 Childbirth positions
 Contraction
 Presentation
 Breech birth
 Cephalic presentation
 Shoulder presentation
 Rupture of membranes

Postpartum issues 
 Postpartum
 Child care
 Breastfeeding
 Congenital disorders
 Sex after pregnancy

Complications of pregnancy and childbirth

 Complications of pregnancy   ( list)
 abortion
 abruption
 breech birth
 cephalo-pelvic disproportion
 caesarean section, cesarean section, C-section
 dermatoses of pregnancy specific skin conditions during pregnancy
 diabetes
 eclampsia
 ectopic pregnancy
 gestational diabetes
 Group B Streptococcus infection
 HELLP syndrome
 hypertension
 hysterectomy
 Intrauterine Growth Restriction (IUGR)
 macrosomia (big baby)
 malpractice
 miscarriage or stillbirth
 obstetric fistula
 obstetric hemorrhage
 Pelvic girdle pain
 placenta praevia
 pre-eclampsia
 premature birth, preterm labor or prematurity
 small for gestational age (SGA)
 uterine rupture
 uterine incarceration

Obstetrics organizations 
 American Association of Gynecologic Laparoscopists
 American Congress of Obstetricians and Gynecologists
 British Pregnancy Advisory Service
 British Society of Urogynaecologists
 European Society of Gynaecological Oncology
 FOGSI
 Gynecologic Oncology Group
 Ipas (organization)
 Society of Obstetricians and Gynaecologists of Pakistan
 Society of Obstetricians and Gynaecologists of Canada
 World Endometriosis Research Foundation

Obstetrics publications 
 Acta Obstetricia et Gynecologica Scandinavica
 African Journal of Reproductive Health
 American Journal of Obstetrics and Gynecology
 Climacteric (journal)
 The European Journal of Contraception & Reproductive Health Care
 Gynecological Endocrinology
 Human Fertility (Cambridge)
 Human Reproduction (journal)
 Hypertension in Pregnancy
 International Journal of Fertility
 Journal of Human Reproductive Sciences
 Journal of Maternal-Fetal and Neonatal Medicine
 Journal of Obstetrics and Gynaecology
 Journal of Psychosomatic Obstetrics & Gynecology
 Menopause (journal)
 Obstetrics & Gynecology (journal)
 Placenta (journal)
 Reproduction (journal)
 Reproductive Sciences
 Systems Biology in Reproductive Medicine
 Women & Health

Persons influential in obstetrics 
 Edward Kowalski

See also 
 Gynecology

 embryo
 embryology
 gestation
 hormone
 identical twin
 In Vitro Fertilization (IVF)
 labor, labour - see childbirth
 lactation
 live birth
 menstrual cycle
 natural childbirth
 navel
 ovum or egg
 oxytocin or pitocin
 pediatrics
 sterilization
 twin
 umbilical cord
 umbilicus - see navel

References

External links 

 Ingenious - Archive of historical images related to obstetrics, gynaecology, and contraception.
 World Congress on Controversies in Obstetrics, Gynecology & Infertility (COGI)
 American College of Obstetricians and Gynecologists
 OBGYNHealth.net
 Seven Hills Women's Health Centers - Leaders in Women's Health with a helpful women's health library

 
Obstetrics
Obstetrics